Wachusett Brewing Company is a microbrewery and craft brewery in Westminster, Massachusetts. It is the first brewery in Worcester County.. It was founded in 1994 by Ned LaFortune, Peter Quinn, and Kevin Buckler.

History
Wachusett Brewing Company was founded in 1994 by Ned LaFortune, Peter Quinn, and Kevin Buckler, who met while attending Worcester Polytechnic Institute. In 1995, the company's largest account was the Wachusett Mountain Ski Area.

On February 26, 2015, the company opened a new brewhouse to allow them to produce four times more beer.

On March 14, 2018, Wachusett ranked number 49 in The Brewers Association 2017 Top 50 Craft Brewing Companies by Sales Volume list.

On March 12, 2019, Wachusett ranked number 43 in The Brewers Association 2018, Top 50 Craft Brewing Companies by Sales Volume list.

References

External links

 Official website

Beer brewing companies based in Massachusetts
Companies based in Worcester County, Massachusetts
Westminster, Massachusetts